Vítor "Víto" Emanuel Araújo Ferreira (born 18 September 1997) is a Portuguese footballer who plays for Estrela da Amadora, as a midfielder.

Football career
On 21 January 2015, Vító made his professional debut with Rio Ave in a 2014–15 Taça da Liga match against Académica.

References

External links

1997 births
People from Barcelos, Portugal
Sportspeople from Braga District
Living people
Portuguese footballers
Association football midfielders
Rio Ave F.C. players
S.C. Covilhã players
Casa Pia A.C. players
C.F. Estrela da Amadora players
Primeira Liga players
Liga Portugal 2 players